This is a list of Billboard magazine's top popular songs of 1950 according to retail sales.

See also
1950 in music
List of Billboard number-one singles of 1950

References

United States year end
Billboard charts